Sergey Punko (also spelled Sergei, born 10 January 1981 in Navapolatsk) is a formerly Belarusian, now Russian, Paralympic swimmer. He was born with a progressive eye disease, but had normal sight as a child. He started swimming at age 10, and competed nationally and internationally in able-bodied competition until he was 21. By that time, he had less than 5% vision. Classified S12, he began swimming in disability meets in 2002. He quickly broke long-standing world records, and was named World Disabled Swimmer of the Year in 2003.

Up to the 2012 Paralympic Games he has won four gold, six silver and three bronze medals. At the 2012 Summer Paralympics, he won a gold and silver medals for Russia.

In February 2013, Punko held S12 long course world records in 200, 400 and 800 metre freestyle and 200 metre butterfly events.

References

External links 
 

Paralympic swimmers of Russia
Paralympic gold medalists for Russia
Paralympic gold medalists for Belarus
Paralympic silver medalists for Belarus
Paralympic silver medalists for Russia
Paralympic bronze medalists for Belarus
Paralympic bronze medalists for Russia
Swimmers at the 2004 Summer Paralympics
Swimmers at the 2008 Summer Paralympics
Swimmers at the 2012 Summer Paralympics
1981 births
Living people
People from Navapolatsk
World record holders in paralympic swimming
Medalists at the 2004 Summer Paralympics
Medalists at the 2008 Summer Paralympics
Medalists at the 2012 Summer Paralympics
S12-classified Paralympic swimmers
Medalists at the World Para Swimming Championships
Medalists at the World Para Swimming European Championships
Paralympic medalists in swimming
Sportspeople from Vitebsk Region